The Ramalinaceae are a family of lichenized fungi in the order Lecanorales. The family name is synonymous with the name Bacidiaceae. Species of this family have a widespread distribution.

Genera

Aciculopsora
Adelolecia
Arthrosporum
Bacidia
Bacidina
Bacidiopsora
Badimia
Bibbya
Biatora
Bilimbia
Catinaria
Cenozosia
Cliostomum
Compsocladium
Coppinsidea
Crocynia
Echidnocymbium
Frutidella
Heppsora
Herteliana
Japewia
Jarmania
Krogia
Lecania
Lopezaria
Lueckingia
Myelorrhiza
Phyllopsora
Physcidia
Ramalina
Ramalinopsis
Rolfidium
Schadonia
Scutula
Stirtoniella
Thamnolecania
Tibellia
Toninia
Toniniopsis
Triclinum – synonymous with Squamacidia Brako
Vermilacinia
Waynea

References

 
Lichen families
Lecanoromycetes families
Taxa described in 1821
Taxa named by Carl Adolph Agardh